Francis Chuck Patton is an African-American comics artist and animator. He is best known for his work on DC Comics' Justice League of America in the 1980s, specifically for the period in which the team relocated to Detroit and was staffed with new, multicultural super-heroes. With writer Gerry Conway, Patton created Gypsy and Vibe, as well as redesigning Vixen and Steel, The Indestructible Man.

Career

Comics 
A self-taught comics artist, although with a degree in art, Patton's influences included José Luis García-López, John Buscema, Gil Kane, Neal Adams, and Dick Giordano. Patton was interested in journalism, but was enticed into a comics career in large part thanks to Giordano by then a top executive at DC. Patton entered the comics industry in 1983 by penciling a brief run of Creeper back-up stories in The Flash.

After drawing various titles including Green Lantern, The Brave and the Bold, and the "Green Arrow" backup feature in Detective Comics, Patton became the artist of Justice League of America beginning with the August 1983 issue. During this period, Patton's roommate was fellow comics artist Shawn McManus. Patton drew issues ##217–227 and 233–239 of JLA, a period in the title's history when it underwent great changes — including the core characters of Superman, Batman, and Wonder Woman leaving the team, and the introduction of the new multicultural lineup. These changes were not well received by readers, and Patton left the title feeling as if he bore the brunt of the fans' anger. In addition to Gypsy and Vibe, Patton also co-created the Cadre, the Overmaster, and Paragon. Vibe has since become a supporting character on The CW's television series The Flash, portrayed by actor Carlos Valdes.

After leaving Justice League, Patton was unsuccessful in gaining another regular penciling assignment. Instead, he worked on single issues or short runs of such DC titles as Action Comics Weekly, Blue Beetle, Legion of Super-Heroes, The New Teen Titans, Omega Men, The Outsiders, Secret Origins, and Vigilante. He was one of the contributors to the DC Challenge limited series in 1985.

During this period, Patton did sporadic work for Eclipse Comics and Marvel Comics, on such titles as New DNAgents, Daredevil, and Classic X-Men. He was considered to replace the outgoing Todd McFarlane on The Incredible Hulk, but turned the offer down when he was asked to emulate McFarlane's distinctive art style.

Animation 
In 1988, after half a decade in the comics industry, Patton became disillusioned with comics and moved into children's television animation. He was living in Los Angeles by this time, which is where most animated series were produced. Patton's credits include Dinosaucers, G.I. Joe, Captain N: The Game Master, The Adventures of Super Mario Bros. 3, Inspector Gadget Saves Christmas, and Teen Titans.

Patton has become a successful animation director, helming such projects as Dead Space: Downfall, Teenage Mutant Ninja Turtles and Todd McFarlane's Spawn, for which Patton garnered an Emmy Award for "Outstanding Animated Program".

Awards

Emmy Award 
 1993 - Outstanding Animated Program (nomination) — Inspector Gadget Saves Christmas
 1999 - Outstanding Animated Program — Todd McFarlane's Spawn

Bibliography

DC Comics

 Action Comics Weekly #613–618 (Nightwing) (1988)  
 Batman #385 (1985)  
 Blue Beetle #10 (1987)  
 The Brave and the Bold #198 (Batman and Karate Kid) (1983)  
 DC Challenge #2 (1985)  
 Detective Comics #533–534 (Green Arrow backup stories) (1983–1984) 
 The Flash #320–323 (Creeper backup stories) (1983) 
 Green Lantern vol. 2 #163, 177 (1983–1984)  
 Justice League of America #217–227, 233–239, Annual #2 (1983–1985)
 Justice League of America vol. 2 #7 (three pages) (2007)  
 Legion of Super-Heroes vol. 3 #19 (1986)  
 The New Teen Titans vol. 2 #15–16 (1985–1986)  
 Omega Men #29–30, 36 (1985–1986)  
 Outsiders Special #1 (1987)  
 Secret Origins vol. 2 #12 (Challengers of the Unknown) (1987)  
 Tales of the Teen Titans #56–58 (1985) 
 Teen Titans Spotlight #13, 16 (1987)  
 Vigilante #6–7, 31, 33, 35 (1984–1986)
 Who's Who: The Definitive Directory of the DC Universe #1, 3–5, 10–11, 14, 16, 18, 20, 22–23, 26 (1985–1987)
 Who's Who: Update '87 #4–5 (1987)

Eclipse Comics
 New DNAgents #4, 6, 11 (1985–1986)

Marvel Comics
 Classic X-Men #14–15 (1987)  
 Daredevil #245 (1987)  
 Marvel Super-Heroes vol. 2 #2 (Tigra) (1990)
 Official Handbook of the Marvel Universe Deluxe Edition #16 (1987)

References

External links
 
 
 Chuck Patton at Mike's Amazing World of Comics
 

20th-century American artists
21st-century American artists
African-American comics creators
American animators
American comics artists
American comics creators
DC Comics people
Living people
Marvel Comics people
Year of birth missing (living people)
Primetime Emmy Award winners